Carl Jah (Carl Haasis) is an American rock musician and co-founder of the band Dread Zeppelin. He was the lead guitarist with the band from its founding until 1995, and returned for a period in the 2000s. In 2012, he released his first solo album, Re-Purpose.

References

Further reading 
 Guitar Player Magazine January 1991 interview with Carl Jah and Jah Paul Jo

External links 
 
 
 

Living people
Year of birth missing (living people)
American rock guitarists
American male guitarists